Velma Jean Terrell (born November 26, 1944) is an American R&B and jazz singer. She replaced Diana Ross as the lead singer of The Supremes in January 1970.

Biography

Early life and career
She is the sister of the former WBA heavyweight boxing champion Ernie Terrell, who fought Muhammad Ali.

Moving from Belzoni, Mississippi to Chicago for a better life at an early age, Jean Terrell was guided by her family to sing, and it was in the late 1960s that she and her brother formed a group called Ernie Terrell and the Heavyweights.

The Supremes (1970–1973)
Motown president Berry Gordy discovered the 24-year-old Terrell in 1969 in Miami, Florida where she was performing with her brother at a club.

Looking for a replacement for his protégée, Diana Ross, who was leaving the group she had fronted during most of the 1960s, The Supremes, for a solo career, Gordy first signed Terrell to Motown as a solo artist, but then decided to drop her into The Supremes as Ross's replacement alongside Mary Wilson and Cindy Birdsong. She recorded much of the new post-Ross Supremes material in the studios, and rehearsed the group's new act during the day with Wilson and Birdsong, while Ross, Wilson and Birdsong performed as Diana Ross & The Supremes at night.

After Ross's farewell show with the group at the Frontier Hotel in Las Vegas on January 14, 1970, Terrell joined the group on stage to be presented to the press and public. After this introduction, according to Mary Wilson, Gordy changed his mind about Terrell leading the group and suggested replacing her with another Motown act Syreeta Wright. Wilson vetoed this move, preferring to stick with Terrell.

Terrell made an instant impact fronting the new Supremes, recording prolifically and successfully with several of Motown's top producers. The revitalized Supremes scored more chart success right from the beginning of the new decade; scoring big in the United Kingdom, while managing several pop and soul hits in the United States: "Up the Ladder to the Roof", "Everybody's Got the Right to Love", "Stoned Love", "River Deep – Mountain High" (with the Four Tops), "Nathan Jones", and "Floy Joy".

After the success of "Floy Joy," Birdsong quit to start a family and was replaced by Lynda Laurence (a former member of Stevie Wonder's group the Third Generation). Despite the initial successes, toward the end of 1973, Terrell and Laurence decided that it would be best for the Supremes to leave Motown and seek another record company.  As Motown, and not Mary Wilson, owned the name "Supremes", both Terrell and Laurence left the group that year.  All three Supremes were unhappy with Motown's seeming lack of interest in promoting this line-up of the group. In addition, Laurence was expecting a child at the time. So Scherrie Payne replaced Terrell and Cindy Birdsong returned to replace Laurence, although it would not be until 1975 that the group released any further recordings.

Solo career
Signing a contract with A&M Records, Terrell had finished a solo recording, I Had to Fall in Love, in 1978. In the early 1980s Terrell put together a one-woman show and did limited touring throughout the United States.  Her act consisted of several Supremes songs, songs from her solo album and cover versions of songs by Bette Midler and Lionel Richie.  Friend and former Supreme Lynda Laurence would often perform background vocals for Terrell during these tours.  Another who performed backing vocals for Terrell during these tours was Freddi Poole, later a member of Scherrie and Lynda's group the F.L.O.S. (Former ladies of The Supremes).

Former Ladies of the Supremes

In 1985, eight years after the Supremes officially broke up in 1977, Scherrie Payne, the third and final Supremes lead singer, was signed to SuperStar International Records, a Los Angeles-based record company. SuperStar approached her with the idea of reforming the Supremes, to which she agreed, and called on former Supremes Mary Wilson and Cindy Birdsong. Wilson declined, instead opting to forge a solo career, while Birdsong agreed and coaxed former Supreme Jean Terrell to join the new Supremes group.

The three of them set about forming a new incarnation of The Supremes, although due to contractual difficulties over the ownership of the name (Mary Wilson was involved in lengthy lawsuits with Motown over ownership and rights to the name) decided to create an entirely new group under the name "FLOS", The Former Ladies of the Supremes. Before the FLOS got off the ground, Birdsong left for a solo career recording briefly for U.K. based Hi-Hat Records. Former Supreme Lynda Laurence joined the lineup, replacing Cindy Birdsong just as she had in 1972; and in 1986, the group was officially formed. The group released the song "We're Back", backed with "Getaway", as 12-inch versions. It featured all three ladies showcasing their vocals with a contemporary pop sound. Because SuperStar International Records did not have national distribution, the song failed to chart and the label soon folded. The group began touring around this time, making their debut at The Wilshire Ebell Theatre in Los Angeles in 1987. Former Supreme Mary Wilson came along to show support to her former groupmates at this concert. Backing vocals at this concert were provided by Lynda's sister and soon-to-be group member, Sundray Tucker.

In 1989 the FLOS signed to British producer Ian Levine's Motorcity Records project, joining a roster of former Motown artists at the label. The first single by the FLOS on the new label was an original tune called "Crazy about the Guy" (MOTC 13), released during that summer, and featuring Jean on lead vocals. This single, together with all releases by the group on the Motorcity Records label ran the credit as Jean, Scherrie & Lynda Formerly of The Supremes. The follow-up single was a re-make of the classic Supremes hit "Stoned Love" (MOTC 56) which saw Scherrie and Jean splitting lead vocal duties between one another. The single's b-side contained a live version of "Crazy about the Guy". The next single was "I Want to Be Loved" (MOTC 77), showcasing the lead vocals of all three ladies. The b-side contained two remixes of the track. The final single for Motorcity, the Lynda-led "Hit & Miss" (MOTC 88), was released in 1991 and the ladies were credited as 'The Supremes' and all of their back catalogue of recordings made for Motorcity are marketed as just 'The Supremes' since then. The ladies also released a single with label-mates The Originals, called "Back By Popular Demand", an original tune, which Laurence has stated as one of her favorite songs on the Motorcity label. An album called Bouncing Back was scheduled to be released but the label ran into financial difficulties before it could be released. The album eventually was released by various labels. One song scheduled for inclusion on the album was "How Do You Keep The Music Playing" which has since become a staple of the group's live act.

After the F.L.O.S.

In December 1992, Terrell left the F.L.O.S. and has since released a biographical DVD, "Through the Eyes of a Supreme". She continues to sing with jazz musicians as well as making an occasional appearance onstage (along with Freddi Poole and Mary Flowers), singing Supremes hits.

Personal life

Jean was married to Juan Thompson; the union produced two sons, Jason and Jonathan.

References

1944 births
Living people
20th-century African-American women singers
A&M Records artists
American rhythm and blues singers
People from Belzoni, Mississippi
The Supremes members
Motown artists